False Metal (later reissued as Break Out) is the debut album from the Finnish rock band Brother Firetribe.

Track listing
Break Out
Valerie
I'm On Fire
Love Goes Down
Devil's Daughter
Midnite Queen
One Single Breath
Lover Tonite
Spanish Eyes
Kill City Kid

Personnel
Pekka Ansio Heino: Lead vocals
Emppu Vuorinen: Electric and acoustic guitars
Tomppa Nikulainen: Keyboards, synthesizers
Jason Flinck: Bass, backing vocals
Kalle Torniainen: Drums, percussion

References

2006 debut albums
Brother Firetribe albums
Spinefarm Records albums